W80 or W-80 may refer to:

 W80 (nuclear warhead), an American thermonuclear warhead designed for cruise missiles
 DSC-W80, a compact digital camera made by Sony
 PENTAX Optio W80, a consumer digital camera made by Pentax Corporation
 Westland W-80, a proposed Westland Aircraft helicopter

In athletics:
 Masters athletics, an age group for athletes aged 35+